The Wild Olive is a lost 1915 American drama silent film directed by Oscar Apfel and written by Elmer Blaney Harris, Basil King and Oliver Morosco. The film stars Myrtle Stedman, Forrest Stanley, Mary Ruby, Charles Marriott, Edmund Lowe and Herbert Standing. The film was released on June 24, 1915, by Paramount Pictures.

Plot
Nicknamed "Wild Olive," Miriam Strange discovers that her mom was an Indian, she moves to a hovel close to an Allegheny stumble camp. Norrie Passage, straight from school, visits his uncle, the tormenting manager of the camp, and meets Miriam. After his uncle is killed with a blade discovered covered up under Norrie's bedding, Norrie is condemned to pass on. In spite of the fact that he pledged to wed her, after his letters to "Wild Olive" return undelivered, Norrie, wearing a facial hair growth and an accepted name, gets connected with to Evie Wayne, Miriam's stepsister. At the point when Norrie is shipped off be his association's New York director, he meets Miriam once more. She forfeits her adoration and consents to wed attorney Charles Victory, in the event that he will demonstrate Norrie's blamelessness. After Evie finds out about Norrie's past and breaks the commitment, the killer makes a deathbed admission. Conquest discharges Miriam when he sees that she adores Norrie.

Cast

References

External links 
 
 
 original lobby poster (BrianBusby)

1915 films
1910s English-language films
Silent American drama films
1915 drama films
Lost American films
Paramount Pictures films
Films directed by Oscar Apfel
American black-and-white films
American silent feature films
Films based on Canadian novels
1915 lost films
Lost drama films
1910s American films